Francis White (March 4, 1892 – 1961) was an American diplomat. He was born in Baltimore. He served as U.S. Minister to Czechoslovakia in 1933, U.S. Ambassador to Mexico between 1953 and 1957, and U.S. Ambassador to Sweden between 1957 and 1958.

Notes

1892 births
1961 deaths
Ambassadors of the United States to Mexico
Ambassadors of the United States to Sweden
American expatriates in Czechoslovakia